Küçükyalı railway station is a railway station in Maltepe, Istanbul. It was a station on the Haydarpaşa suburban commuter line from 1951 to 2013 and is the westernmost station in Maltepe. The station platforms were rebuilt and expanded for the Marmaray commuter rail system that opened on 12 March 2019. Before its demolition, Küçükyalı had two side platforms with two tracks. The new station have an island platform with two tracks as well as a third track for express trains.

Küçükyalı station was opened on 22 September 1872 by the Ottoman government as part of a railway from Kadıköy to İzmit.

References

Railway stations in Istanbul Province
Railway stations opened in 1872
1872 establishments in the Ottoman Empire
Maltepe, Istanbul
Marmaray